Domhnall Gleeson (born 12 May 1983) is an Irish actor and screenwriter. He is the son of actor Brendan Gleeson, with whom he has appeared in a number of films and theatre projects. He received a Bachelor of Arts in Media Arts from Dublin Institute of Technology.

During the early stages of his career, Gleeson directed and wrote several short films, garnered a Tony Award nomination in 2006 for his role in the Broadway production The Lieutenant of Inishmore, and had a supporting role in Never Let Me Go. He became known to a wider audience for his portrayal of Bill Weasley in the last two entries of the Harry Potter film series (2010–2011), Tim Lake in About Time (2013), and Russell Allen Phillips in the fact-based war drama Unbroken (2014). Gleeson has won three IFTA Awards for his performances in When Harvey Met Bob (2010), Anna Karenina (2012), and Frank (2014).

In the following years, Gleeson received widespread recognition and praise for his performances in several Academy Award-nominated films: Caleb Smith in Ex Machina (2014), Jim Farrell in Brooklyn (2015), and Captain Andrew Henry in The Revenant (2015). He has also starred as General Armitage Hux in the Star Wars sequel trilogy (2015-2019). In 2020, he had a main role in the HBO black comedy series Run. The same year, he was listed at number 21 on The Irish Times list of Ireland's greatest film actors. In 2023 he received a Golden Globe and Critics Choice nomination for his role in the limited series The Patient.

Early life 
Gleeson was born the eldest of four boys in Dublin, Ireland. He was raised in Malahide, County Dublin, the eldest son of Mary (née Weldon) and actor Brendan Gleeson. He has three brothers: Fergus, Brian (also an actor), and Rory. He attended Malahide Community School, where he performed in school productions of Grease and King Lear. Gleeson later graduated with a Bachelor of Arts in Media Arts from the Dublin Institute of Technology.

Career

2001–2009: Theatre and early recognition
After graduating, Gleeson began directing and writing for both film and stage. He first appeared in the British television miniseries Rebel Heart in 2001 with James D'Arcy and Paloma Baeza. Gleeson made his film debut in Martin McDonagh's short film Six Shooter in 2004, which starred his father. The film won the Academy Award for Best Live Action Short Film. He was featured in a small role in the 2005 horror comedy Boy Eats Girl. In 2006, Gleeson starred in the feature film Studs, with his father appearing alongside him. He was among the main cast members of RTÉ comedy television series The Last Furlong in 2005. Gleeson appeared on the Broadway theatre show The Lieutenant of Inishmore at age twenty-three, receiving a Tony Award nomination for his role as the dim-witted Davey. In late 2007, Gleeson played Herbert Pocket in the Hugh Leonard adaptation of Charles Dickens's Great Expectations at the Gate Theatre in Dublin. The role was described as being "wittily played" by Irish Independent critic Bruce Arnold. Earlier that year he had a role as Bobby in the David Mamet play American Buffalo, also at the Gate Theatre.

In 2008, Gleeson starred in the one-off RTÉ comedy sketch show Your Bad Self, which was broadcast on 26 December that year and later developed into a series in 2010. In March 2009, it was confirmed that he had been cast as Bill Weasley in the film Harry Potter and the Deathly Hallows. His father, Brendan, plays Alastor Moody in the series. Gleeson had initially been reluctant to act alongside his father in the same film but later changed his mind. In 2006, he said of his acting: "I'd been very certain about not wanting to do the acting thing because of my father. I thought I'd always have the father-son thing of 'He got you the role'." The 2009 HBO television film A Dog Year starring Jeff Bridges, featured Gleeson as handyman Anthony Armstrong. Also that year, in the film Sensation, Gleeson played the role of a young farmer whose "soulless encounter" with a call-girl "develops into a bittersweet love story".

2010–2014: Career breakthrough

His first release of 2010 was the dystopian romance Never Let Me Go, starring Carey Mulligan, Keira Knightley, and Andrew Garfield. Harry Potter and the Deathly Hallows – Part 1 was released in November 2010, with the Part 2 being released the following July. His portrayal of Bill Weasley, Ron Weasley's older brother, exposed Gleeson to a wider audience. The multi Academy Award nominated Coen Brothers' film True Grit featured Gleeson as Moon, a young outlaw. His short comedy film, Noreen, starring his father and brother, was shown at the Tribeca Film Festival. He portrayed musician Bob Geldof as he organises the 1985 Live Aid concert in the television film When Harvey Met Bob, which was broadcast on BBC Four on 26 December 2010. Gleeson won the 2011 Ifta Award for Best Actor for his performance in the film.

In the drama Shadow Dancer, released in August 2012, he played an IRA member whose own sister informs on him to the MI5. Gleeson played landowner Kostya Levin in the historical romance Anna Karenina, based on the Leo Tolstoy novel. The Daily Telegraph critic Tim Robey praised his performance, saying Gleeson "nails Levin’s adorable self-seriousness without sentimentalising what can make him hard work." His final release of 2012 was the science fiction action film Dredd starring Karl Urban as the titular Judge Dredd, in which he played an unnamed computer expert working for the gang Dredd battles against.

Gleeson made a guest appearance in "Be Right Back", an episode of the science-fiction anthology series Black Mirror in 2013. Starring alongside Hayley Atwell, he played a man who is killed in a car crash, but returns to his lover as a synthetic android clone of himself. Later in 2013, Gleeson starred in About Time, a romantic comedy written and directed by Richard Curtis. The story follows a young man, played by Gleeson, who uses time travel to win over an American girl, played by Rachel McAdams. Filming took place in London, England, in June 2012. In a largely negative review, Catherine Shaord of The Guardian described Gleeson as a "ginger Hugh Grant", although she noted that "The effect, at first, is unnerving; as About Time marches on, Gleeson's innate charm gleams through and this weird disconnection becomes quite compelling."

In Lenny Abrahamson's Frank (2014), he portrayed Jon, a wannabe musician who joins the band of the eccentric, papier-mâché head-wearing titular character played by Michael Fassbender. Gleeson played a small role as a psychotic killer in the Irish drama Calvary, starring his father as a Catholic priest who visits him in prison. His last release of 2014, was Angelina Jolie's directorial debut, the war film Unbroken. In the film, Gleeson portrayed a soldier lost at sea after a plane crash in Pacific Ocean during the Second World War. He lost what he described as a "sizable amount of weight" for the role. Along with his father and brother Brian, Gleeson created and stars in the Immatürity For Charity comedy sketches, which raise money for the St. Francis Hospice in Raheny, Dublin. Gleeson directed and starred in a music video for the Squarehead charity single "2025" in 2014, with all proceeds going to Immatürity For Charity.

2015–present: Leading man and mainstream cinema
2015 saw Gleeson appear in four films, all of which received Oscar nominations. His first release of the year was the science fiction psychological thriller Ex Machina, which was filmed at a hotel in Valldalen, Norway in the summer of 2013 and released in January 2015. The film stars Gleeson as a programmer who wins a competition to visit the home of his company's CEO (Oscar Isaac) and test the human qualities of the artificially intelligent humanoid robot Ava, who is played by Alicia Vikander. The film was the directorial debut of Never Let Me Go and Dredd screenwriter Alex Garland and their third collaboration. Ex Machina was met with critical acclaim for its performances, screenplay, direction, and visual effects. In the romantic period drama Brooklyn, he appeared in a supporting role as a romantic interest of Saoirse Ronan's character, a young Irish woman living in Brooklyn in the 1950s. Gleeson was announced to be a part of the Star Wars sequel trilogy in April 2014. The first installment, Star Wars: The Force Awakens, was released in December 2015. Gleeson plays the ruthless General Hux, commander of the First Order's Starkiller Base. Throughout the film, Hux is vying for power with First Order commander Kylo Ren, who is portrayed by Adam Driver. In his last release of the year, Gleeson co-starred in Alejandro G. Iñárritu's western The Revenant as fur trader Andrew Henry, with Leonardo DiCaprio portraying fur trapper Hugh Glass. Alongside his brother Brian and his father Brendan, Gleeson starred in a revival of the Enda Walsh play The Walworth Farce from January to February 2015. In February 2016, Gleeson narrated the BBC Two nature documentary series Earth's Greatest Spectacles.

Gleeson played fashion house Burberry's founder, Thomas Burberry, in a short Christmas-themed advertisement film for the company in 2016. He made a guest appearance on the Channel 4 sitcom Catastrophe as a recruitment consultant in March 2017. Gleeson then played fictional CIA agent Monty Schafer in American Made, released in September 2017, starring Tom Cruise as drug smuggler Barry Seal. Also in September, Gleeson had a small role in Darren Aronofsky's psychological horror film Mother! in which he shared significant screen time with his brother, starred alongside Christina Applegate and Thomas Haden Church in the independent comedy Crash Pad, and portrayed Winnie-the-Pooh creator A. A. Milne in the biographical film Goodbye Christopher Robin. His portrayal of Milne was deemed as being played a "little too stiffly" by BBC critic Nicholas Barber. Gleeson reprised his role as General Hux in Star Wars: The Last Jedi, released in December 2017.

In his first film of 2018, Gleeson co-starred as National Lampoon magazine co-founder and writer Henry Beard in the biographical comedy A Futile and Stupid Gesture, opposite Will Forte as the magazine's co-founder Doug Kenney. Gleeson next starred in Peter Rabbit (2018) – based on the stories of the character of the same by Beatrix Potter – as Thomas McGregor, the great-grandnephew and heir to Mr. McGregor. The adaptation received a mixed reception from critics, although Deadline Hollywood critic Pete Hammond praised "an appealing Gleeson" for "overcoming the unlikable aspects of Thomas". The film fared better at the box office, grossing over $350 million globally. Gleeson starred alongside his brother and father in the short film Psychic, which was directed by the latter and premiered in 2018 on Sky Arts.

Also in 2018, Gleeson starred in the supernatural thriller The Little Stranger, with Ruth Wilson. The story concerns a country doctor (Gleeson) who takes on a patient living in a possibly haunted old estate, where he falls in love with the owner's youngest daughter (Wilson). It was Gleeson's second collaboration with director Lenny Abrahamson, following Frank. He next featured in a supporting role in the crime drama The Kitchen (2019) as an intense Vietnam War veteran who becomes a hitman for the Irish Mob.

In late 2019, Gleeson returned to the role of General Hux in Star Wars: The Rise of Skywalker, the last film of the nine-movie series. He reprised his role as Thomas McGregor in Peter Rabbit 2 (2021).

In 2022, he starred in the FX on Hulu psychological thriller limited series The Patient as Sam Fortner, a serial killer, alongside Steve Carell.

Personal life
Gleeson resides in Ballsbridge, Dublin.

Gleeson shares a love of the English football team Aston Villa with his father Brendan. He described the team's FA Cup semifinal win over Liverpool at Wembley Stadium in 2015, as one of the "great days of my life".

In an April 2020 interview with The Guardian, Gleeson stated that it never crossed his mind to change his surname at the beginning of his career to stay out of his father's shadow. His reasoning was that his father was not as well-known internationally at that time, and everyone in the Irish film industry already knew of their relationship.

Filmography

Film

Television

Stage

Video games

Theme park attractions

Awards and nominations

References

External links

 

Gleeson family
1983 births
Alumni of Dublin Institute of Technology
Irish male film actors
Irish writers
Living people
Irish male television actors
21st-century Irish male actors
Irish male voice actors
Male actors from Dublin (city)
People from Malahide